Thesprotia was an ancient Greek city located in the region of Epirus.

See also
List of cities in ancient Epirus

References

Sources

Cities in ancient Epirus